The Heart Is a Lonely Hunter is a 1968 American film adaptation of the 1940 novel of the same name by Carson McCullers. It was directed by Robert Ellis Miller. It stars Alan Arkin and introduces Sondra Locke, who both earned Academy Award nominations for their performances. The film updates the novel's small-town Southern setting from the Depression era to the contemporary 1960s. The film is recognized by the American Film Institute in AFI's 100 Years of Film Scores – Nominated.

Plot
John Singer is a deaf-mute who works as a silver engraver in a southern US town. His only friend is a mentally disabled mute, Spiros Antonapoulos, who continually gets into trouble with the law, since he does not know any better. When Spiros is committed to a mental institution by his cousin, who is his guardian, John offers to become Spiros' guardian, but he is told that Spiros will have to go to the institution until this has been arranged. John decides to move to a town near the institution in order to be near his friend.  He finds work there and rents a room in the home of Mr. and Mrs. Kelly, who are having financial difficulties as a result of Mr. Kelly's recent hip injury.

Because the Kellys' teenage daughter, Margaret ("Mick"), resents having to give up her room to him, John tries to win her friendship. He also tries to become friends with Jake Blount, a semi-alcoholic drifter, and Dr. Copeland, an embittered African American physician who is secretly dying of lung cancer. John helps interpret for a deaf-mute patient who is seeing Dr. Copeland. Copeland's deepest disappointment is that his educated daughter, Portia, works as a domestic and is married to a field hand. Meanwhile, Mick has an outdoor teenage party at her house, but is disgusted after some boy guests disrupt it by fighting and setting off fireworks.
 
Following a successful attempt to win Mick's friendship by encouraging her love for classical music, John visits Spiros and, although he takes him out for the day, John is lonelier than ever when he returns home. Meanwhile, Portia and her husband are attacked and he is jailed for defending himself at an incident at a carnival. Portia gets upset at Dr. Copeland for not perjuring himself to help bring out the truth about what happened in the fight. Dr. Copeland and Portia's relationship gets even more strained after her husband has his leg amputated after being placed in irons for trying to escape jail.

John gets them to reconcile after Portia learns from John of Dr. Copeland's illness. Mick willfully loses her virginity to the sensitive older brother of one of her classmates after she realizes that her father's injury has permanently disabled him and she will have to leave school and work to help support the family. Disturbed by her sexual initiation, she ignores John's request for some company. John goes to visit Spiros and learns that he has been dead for several weeks. After visiting his friend's grave, pacing and apologizing over and over in sign language, John returns to his room and commits suicide.

Some months afterwards, Mick brings flowers to John's grave and meets Dr. Copeland. As they talk, Mick asks the question, "Why did he do it?" Dr. Copeland leaves, and the film ends with Mick admitting out loud to John's open grave that she loved him.

Cast

 Alan Arkin as John Singer
 Sondra Locke as Margaret "Mick" Kelly
 Laurinda Barrett as Mrs. Kelly
 Stacy Keach (as Stacy Keach, Jr.) as Jake Blount
 Chuck McCann as Spiros Antonapoulos
 Biff McGuire as Mr. Kelly
 Percy Rodriguez as Dr. Benedict Mady Copeland
 Cicely Tyson as Portia Copeland
 Jackie Marlowe as Bubber Kelly
 Johnny Popwell as Willie 
 Wayne Smith as Harry Minowitz
 Gonzalo Meroño as Richard Steward
 Peter Mamakos as Spirmonedes
 John O'Leary as Beaudine
 Hubert Harper as Biff Brannon
 Sherri Vise as Delores
 Anna Lee Carroll as Nurse Bradford

Production
Alan Arkin was the first actor chosen for the film.

Sondra Locke, then known as Sandra Locke, was a 23-year-old WSM-TV staff employee when she auditioned for the role of Mick on July 28, 1967. To seem younger, Locke shaved six years off her age—a lie she maintained for the rest of her career. Although she was outed by The Billings Gazette and
The Nashville Tennessean, it took decades for syndicated publications to catch on. Actress Bonnie Bedelia, four years Locke's junior, told the Los Angeles Times that "they decided I was too old" to play Mick.

In addition to changing her age, an international press release announcing Locke's casting omitted her time at Middle Tennessee State University as well as her residence in Nashville, where she had moved in 1963 after dropping out of college. The actress admitted to lying about her age in her autobiography The Good, the Bad & the Very Ugly (1997), but claimed to have knocked only three years off, rather than six. In her final interview, conducted in 2015 for a movie podcast called The Projection Booth, Locke said that she "was just graduating high school" when she started work on the film when she was in fact in her mid-20s. Her salary was reported as $15,000 in newspapers at the time, but Locke later claimed it was less than one-third that amount.

For the role of Mick's love interest Harry, director Robert Ellis Miller cast Wayne Smith, five years younger than Locke, even though the character is described in the screenplay as being older than Mick.

Percy Rodriguez, who played Cicely Tyson's father, was only six years older than Tyson. Although Laurinda Barrett played Locke's mother, she was only 12½ years older than Locke.

Filming began on September 18, 1967 in Selma, Alabama, and lasted for six to eight weeks. Locke married Gordon Anderson during the making of the film.

Reception
Gregg J. Kilday of The Harvard Crimson criticized how some characters are "cardboard remains" of novel versions; he wrote that Spiros "is grossly overplayed", Blount "has been reduced to a drunken bum (someone was afraid to dirty their camera in politics)" and that Dr. Copeland and Portia's relationship "plays like a Black Power version of The Secret Storm."

Awards and nominations

See also
 List of films featuring the deaf and hard of hearing

References

External links

1968 films
1968 drama films
American coming-of-age drama films
1960s coming-of-age drama films
American Sign Language films
Films about deaf people
Films about intellectual disability
Films about racism
Films based on American novels
Films based on works by Carson McCullers
Films directed by Robert Ellis Miller
Films scored by Dave Grusin
Films set in Georgia (U.S. state)
Films shot in Alabama
Southern Gothic films
Warner Bros. films
1960s English-language films
1960s American films